Maxim Alexandrovich Suraykin (born 8 August 1978) is a Russian politician who has been the leader of the political party Communists of Russia (2012–2022) and member of the Legislative Assembly of Ulyanovsk Oblast (2018–2022).

Suraykin was Communists of Russia's candidate for the 2018 presidential election.

Life and career
Suraykin was born on 8 August 1978 in Moscow.

In 1993, Suraykin was one of the defenders of the Supreme Soviet.

In 2000, he graduated from Moscow State University of Railway Engineering.

After graduating, he founded and for ten years ran a computer equipment repair company.

Suraykin worked as a lecturer at the Department of Management of Moscow State University of Railways.

From 1996 to June 2004, he was a member of the Communist Party. He was the Secretary of the Kirov District Committee of the Communist Party of Moscow. He was elected a member of the Moscow City Committee of the Communist Party, a candidate member of the Central Committee of the Communist Party, and a delegate of the IX Congress of the Communist Party. Suraykin was part of the leadership of the youth section of the Communist Party in Moscow.

He was elected advisor of the District Assembly of the Tverskoy District of Moscow (1997–1999), and he worked in the Commission on Affairs of Minors.

In June 2002, he was elected Secretary of the Central Committee of the all-Russian public organization "Union of Communist youth of the Russian Federation" (SKM RF) on organizational and personnel work. In November 2004, he became the first Secretary of Central Committee SKM RF.

In 2010, he headed the public organization Communists of Russia and in 2012 the party Communists of Russia.

In 2013, Suraykin was nominated as a candidate at Moscow mayoral election, but he was not registered due to late submission of documents.

In 2014, he ran for Governor of the Nizhny Novgorod Oblast, and he ran for Governor of the Ulyanovsk Oblast in 2016. Both times, he lost the elections.

In the 2018 regional elections, he was elected to the Legislative Assembly of Ulyanovsk Oblast. On 19 September, he was elected Deputy Chairman of the Legislative Assembly. He joined the Committee on budget and economic policy, as well as the Committee on social policy, local self-government and civil society development.

After the 2022 Russian invasion of Ukraine, he proposed expelling foreign professional athletes from Russia as a retaliation against Western sanctions. On 18 March 2022, the extraordinary congress of the Communists of Russia voted to oust Suraykin for his alleged connections with "unfriendly countries", fraud and "bourgeois way of life", and appointed Sergey Malinkovich instead. Suraykin called the congress "fake" and said that he is still supported by the majority of the party members.

2018 presidential campaign

In December 2016, it became known that the Communists of Russia nominated Suraykin for the presidential election in 2018. On 28 May 2017, the Plenum of the Central Committee of the "Communists of Russia" nominated Maxim Suraykin as candidate to participate in presidential election in 2018.

On 24 December Maxim Suraykin was officially nominated at the Communists Russia National Convention. On the same day he submitted to the Central Election Commission.

During the election campaign, Maxim Suraykin strongly criticized the Communist party for the nomination of businessman Pavel Grudinin as presidential candidate. Suraykin said:

Also, he criticized the leader of the Left Front Sergey Udaltsov for supporting Grudinin:

In his opinion, this decision is fraught with Sergei Udaltsov that he will turn away his supporters:

At the same time, Suraykin himself was also criticized by the Communist party. He was accused of spoiling, especially after the release of his campaign video and logo, which completely copied the video and logo of Pavel Grudinin.

During the campaign Suraykin made several trips around the country. Following the election, he scored 499,342 votes (0.68%), taking seventh (penultimate) place.

Electoral history

References

1978 births
Living people
Russian communists
Communists of Russia politicians
Communist Party of the Russian Federation members
Neo-Stalinists
Politicians from Moscow
Russian Marxists
21st-century Russian politicians
Candidates in the 2018 Russian presidential election
Mordvin people